Laff or LAFF may refer to:

 Laff (TV network), digital multicast television network featuring comedy programming
 Laff Records, an independent record label
 The Laff Stop, a comedy club in Houston, Texas, U.S.
 Laff-A-Lympics, a Saturday morning cartoon series
 Latin American Film Festival, an annual film festival held in Utrecht, Netherlands
 Latin American Foundation for the Future, a UK-based charity supporting street, working and vulnerable children in Peru
 Los Angeles Film Festival, an annual film festival held in Westwood, Los Angeles, California, U.S.

See also
 Laffer (disambiguation)
 Laughter (disambiguation)